Wang Xiaojing (born 3 May 1992) is a Chinese sport shooter.

She participated at the 2018 ISSF World Shooting Championships, winning a medal.

References

External links

Living people
1992 births
Chinese female sport shooters
Trap and double trap shooters
Shooters at the 2018 Asian Games
Medalists at the 2018 Asian Games
Asian Games bronze medalists for China
Asian Games medalists in shooting
People from Hefei
Shooters at the 2020 Summer Olympics
21st-century Chinese women